Joseph Taylor (1874 – 21 August 1938) was an English professional association footballer who played as a centre half. He played for 323 games and scored 12 goals in the Football League for Burnley during the 1890s and 1900s. After his retirement from football, he became a groundsman at Burnley.

References

1874 births
1938 deaths
Footballers from Burnley
English footballers
Association football defenders
Burnley F.C. players
English Football League players